The discography of Norwegian band Katzenjammer consists of three studio albums, one live album, one extended play, nine singles, one video album and six music videos. Katzenjammer was founded in 2007 by Anne Marit Bergheim, Marianne Sveen, Solveig Heilo and Turid Jørgensen while studying at a private music school in Oslo, Norway.

Katzenjammer worked extensively with composer Mats Rybø in recording their debut studio album, Le Pop, which was released in September 2008. The album reached number nine in Norway and number 71 in the Netherlands. It produced four singles, but they failed to chart worldwide. In 2008, Le Pop was nominated for a Norwegian Spellemannprisen award for Best Debut Album of the Year.

A Kiss Before You Go, the band's second studio album, was released in September 2011. A mixture of folk, cabaret, and rock music, the album peaked at number six in Norway. the album achieved chart success in other European territories, reaching number seven in Germany and 33 in Austria. A Kiss Before You Go was certified gold by the Bundesverband Musikindustrie (BWMI). The album's lead single, "I Will Dance (When I Walk Away)", was a minor hit in Germany, peaking at number 32. A Kiss Before You Go: Live in Hamburg, a live album, and its companion video album followed in 2012.

Albums

Studio albums

Live albums

Extended plays

Singles

Other appearances

Videography

Video albums

Music videos

References

External links
 
 

Discographies of Norwegian artists
Folk music discographies